Denizköy (Turkish: "sea village") may refer to the following places in Turkey:

 Denizköy, Çorum
 Denizköy, Dikili, a village in the district of Dikili, İzmir Province
 Denizköy, Didim, a village in the District of Didim, Aydın Province
 Denizköy VLF transmitter, a facility of the U.S. Navy in the village